The Otava (German Wottawa) is a river in West and South Bohemia, Czech Republic. It is  a left tributary of the Vltava river. The river flows through several towns, including Sušice, Strakonice and Písek. The river's name is of Celtic origin. It is a popular river for water sports. The local dialect of Prachens also uses the name "Wotāva".

References 

 
Rivers of the Plzeň Region
Rivers of the South Bohemian Region
Bohemian Forest